The 2012–13 Azerbaijan Premier League was the twenty first season of the Premier League since its establishment in 1992. The season began on 4 August 2012 and finished on 20 May 2013. Neftchi Baku are the defending champions, having won the previous season.

No club from 2012–13 Azerbaijan First Division was directly promoted.

Teams

A total of 12 teams will contest the league, including 12 sides from the 2011–12 season, which means two teams will not be promoted from the 2011–12 Azerbaijan First Division.

On 10 April 2012, FK Qaradağ sealed promotion to league after winning first division. However, due decision of AFFA about licensing, no clubs from division will be promoted which means all clubs from last season will be remaining in the league.

Stadia and locations
''Note: Table lists in alphabetical order.

Personnel and sponsoring

Note: Flags indicate national team as has been defined under FIFA eligibility rules. Players may hold more than one non-FIFA nationality.

Managerial changes

First round

League table

Results

Second round

Championship group
The top six teams of the first phase participate in this group, which will decide which team will win the championship. Additionally, teams in this group compete for one 2013–14 Champions League and two Europa League spots.

The winners will qualify for the Champions League Second qualifying round, with the runners-up and third place team earning a spot in the Europa League first qualifying round.

Table

Results

Relegation group
The bottom six teams of the first phase will determine the teams to be relegated to the 2013–14 Azerbaijan First Division. The two teams who finish in 11th and 12th position will be relegated to the 2013–14 Azerbaijan First Division.

Table

Results

Season statistics

Top scorers

Source: Azerbaijan Premier League

Hat-tricks

 4 Player scored 4 goals

Scoring
 First goal of the season: Irakli Beraia for Kəpəz against Turan Tovuz (4 August 2012)
 Fastest goal of the season: 1st minute, Yannick Kamanan for Gabala against Khazar Lankaran (22 February 2013)
 Latest goal of the season: 94 minutes and 33 seconds, Slavčo Georgievski for Inter Baku against Turan Tovuz (25 August 2012)
 Largest winning margin: 7 goals
Neftchi Baku 8–1 Sumgayit (17 November 2012)
 Highest scoring game: 9 goals
Neftchi Baku 8–1 Sumgayit (17 November 2012)
 Most goals scored in a match by a single team: 8 goals
Neftchi Baku 8–1 Sumgayit (17 November 2012)
 Most goals scored in a match by a losing team: 3 goals
Turan Tovuz 3–5 Kəpəz (13 May 2013)
Ravan Baku 3–5 AZAL (14 May 2013)

Clean sheets
 Most clean sheets: 16
Inter Baku
Qarabağ
 Fewest clean sheets: 5
Kəpəz
Turan Tovuz

Discipline

 Most yellow cards (club): 96
Kəpəz
 Most yellow cards (player): 14
Samuel Barlay (Ravan Baku)

 Most red cards (club): 8
Khazar Lankaran
Simurq
 Most red cards (player): 3
Aleksandr Chertoganov (Gabala)

References

Azerbaijan Premier League seasons
Azer
1